Snodgrassia is a genus of moths belonging to the subfamily Tortricinae of the family Tortricidae.

Species
Snodgrassia buruana (Diakonoff, 1941)
Snodgrassia calliplecta Diakonoff, 1983
Snodgrassia petrophracta (Meyrick, 1938)
Snodgrassia stenochorda (Meyrick, 1928)

Etymology
The genus is named for insect morphologist Dr. Robert Evans Snodgrass.

See also
List of Tortricidae genera

References

 , 2005 World Catalogue of Insects 5

External links
tortricidae.com

Archipini
Tortricidae genera